Amédée Fournier (7 February 1912 – 30 March 1992) was a French professional road bicycle racer. He won a silver medal at the 1932 Summer Olympics in the team pursuit event.

Major results

1932
Silver medal 1932 olympic games, team pursuit
1938
Nantes - Les Sables d'Olonne
1939
Tour de France
Winner stages 1 and 5
Wearing yellow jersey for one day

References

External links

1912 births
1992 deaths
People from Armentières
Cyclists at the 1932 Summer Olympics
French male cyclists
French Tour de France stage winners
Olympic cyclists of France
Olympic silver medalists for France
French track cyclists
Olympic medalists in cycling
Medalists at the 1932 Summer Olympics
Sportspeople from Nord (French department)
Cyclists from Hauts-de-France
20th-century French people